Te Whaea in Wellington, New Zealand, is the New Zealand National Dance and Drama Centre, the home to the  New Zealand School of Dance and Toi Whakaari: New Zealand Drama School.

Te Whaea is the venue for a number of reoccurring events including national dance training for all ages and the ETNZ conference every two years.

References

External links
 Te Whaea

Buildings and structures in Wellington City
Entertainment venues in New Zealand